Swinson is a surname. Notable people with the surname include:

 Aaron Swinson (born 1971), American basketball player
 Arthur Swinson (c. 1915–1970), British Army officer
 Corey J. Swinson (1969–2013, American football player
 David Swinson Maynard (1808–1873), American pioneer
 Jo Swinson (born 1980), Scottish politician
 Tim Swinson (born 1987), English rugby union footballer

See also
 Thomas-Swinson